Holyoake is a surname. Notable people with the surname include:

Francis Holyoake (1567–1653), British lexicographer
George Holyoake (1817–1906), English secularist and co-operator
Henry Holyoake (1657–1731), headmaster of Rugby School
Holly Holyoake,  Welsh classical music singer 
Sir Keith Jacka Holyoake (1904–1983), New Zealand politician
Ronald Holyoake (1894–1966), English cricketer
Thomas Holyoake (1616?–1675), Church of England cleric

See also
Holyoak, surname
Hollioake, surname
Holyoke (disambiguation)